Wild West is a role-playing game published by Fantasy Games Unlimited in 1981.

Description
Wild West is a Western system of skill-based character rules. The game includes 45 skills, cross-referenced to indicate where they add to each other in determining a character's chance of success, plus rules for employment, gambling, dynamite, horses, cattle drives, mule trains, stage lines, railroads, the military, and the Indians. Dodge City is briefly described as a campaign setting, and the game also includes a map of the Old West.

Publication history
Wild West was designed by Anthony P. LeBoutillier and Gerald D. Seypura, and was published in 1981 by Fantasy Games Unlimited as a boxed set with a 40-page book, a large map, and four reference sheets.

Reception
W.G. Armintrout reviewed Wild West in The Space Gamer No. 52. Armintrout commented that "Wild West is OK in my book - the good basic system makes up for the lack of polish. It is worth looking into."

Reviews
Different Worlds #18 (Jan., 1982)

References

Fantasy Games Unlimited games
Historical Western role-playing games
Role-playing games introduced in 1981